Several vessels have been named Intrepid:

Commercial/private ships
 was launched in 1776, almost surely under another name. She appeared as Intrepid in British records from 1787; missing volumes of Lloyd's Register (LR) and missing pages in extant records obscure her earlier name(s) and history. She made one voyage as a whaler and two as a slave ship. She also captured a Spanish merchant ship. Otherwise she traded widely as a West Indiaman, transport, and to North and South America. She was wrecked in November 1816.
 was launched in Newcastle upon Tyne. She then became a transport. In 1820 she made a voyage to Bengal, sailing under a license from the British East India Company (EIC). She then reverted to being a transport. She was wrecked on 5 January 1826.
 was launched at Whitby in 1829. She traded with Quebec in 1830, later carrying migrants to Canada. She was lost at Colombo in 1834.
, a racing yacht that won the America's Cup

Military ships
 – a British Royal Charter company ship's name. An East India Company shipname
 – a snow belonging to the Bombay Marine that participated in the capture of Malacca on 17 August 1795 and that had an inconclusive engagement with a French privateer off Muscat on 22 November 1800. She foundered without a trace in late 1800 or early 1801. 
 – any one of eight vessels of the British Royal Navy
 – a Republic of Singapore shipname
 – any one of four ships of the United States Navy

See also
Intrepid (disambiguation)
Intrepid class, classes of ships named Intrepid
  – any one of ten ships of the French Navy

Ship names